Mazlan Hamzah is a Malaysian sprinter. He competed in the men's 4 × 100 metres relay at the 1964 Summer Olympics.

References

Year of birth missing (living people)
Living people
People from Muar
People from Johor
Athletes (track and field) at the 1964 Summer Olympics
Malaysian male sprinters
Olympic athletes of Malaysia
Athletes (track and field) at the 1962 British Empire and Commonwealth Games
Commonwealth Games competitors for Malaya
Athletes (track and field) at the 1962 Asian Games
Asian Games competitors for Malaysia